Rhinogobius giurinus is a species of goby native to eastern Asia where it inhabits marine, brackish and fresh waters of rivers and estuaries.  This species can reach a length of  TL.  It is of importance to local peoples as a food fish.

Distribution
The fish's native range includes the Yellow River, Yangtze River, Qiantang River, Lingjiang, Pearl River, Fujian, Guangdong and Hainan regions (except the northwestern part of China including Tibetan Plateau and Yunnan-Guizhou Plateau), Taiwan, Hong Kong, the Korean Peninsula, from Tone River to Iriomote in Ibaraki Prefecture, Kawahara Lake in Nagasaki Prefecture in Japan, Bonin Islands, Ryukyu Islands and North Vietnam.

The species is also introduced into Singapore, Tibetan Plateau and Yunnan.

Habitat
Its habitats include rivers, reservoirs, ponds and estuaries.  Though it is a migratory fish, it can survive and reproduce in a completely closed drainage system.

Diet
The fish feeds on aquatic insects, invertebrates, small fish, zooplankton, phytoplankton and plant detritus.

References

External links
 Hong Kong Biodiversity Online - Barcheek goby

giurinus
Freshwater fish of China
Freshwater fish of Japan
Fish of Korea
Freshwater fish of Taiwan
Fish of Vietnam